Grupo Desportivo Cruz Vermelha (Portuguese for the Red Cross) is a football club that plays in the São Tomé and Príncipe Championship, it is based in the village of Almeirim.  It is named after the Red Cross.  The team has yet to win any major titles in its history.

The club won Group A of the second division in 2003 and participated into the first division.  The club relegated into the second division in 2009 and returned a few years later and returned again in 2014 and i=relegated to the third division for the first time. The club competed in the third division for the next three seasons and was placed second for 2017 and inside the qualification position, the club will return to the Second Division for the following season.

References

External links
GD Cruz Vermelha at the Final Ball

 
Football clubs in São Tomé and Príncipe
São Tomé Island Third Division
Sport in São Tomé